Ironweed is a 1983 novel by William Kennedy. It received the 1984 Pulitzer Prize for Fiction and is the third book in Kennedy's Albany Cycle. It is included in the Western Canon of the critic Harold Bloom.

Plot summary
Ironweed is set during the Great Depression and tells the story of Francis Phelan, a bum originally from Albany, New York, who left his family after accidentally killing his infant son. The novel focuses on Francis's return (after being gone twenty-two years) to Albany over the triduum of All Hallows Eve, All Saints' Day, and All Souls' Day; moreover, a surreal element is added to the narrative as Phelan sees and tries to interact with dead people from his troubled past. The novel features characters that are present in some of Kennedy's other Albany Cycle books.

Adaptations
Kennedy wrote the screenplay for the 1987 film version directed by Héctor Babenco and starring Jack Nicholson and Meryl Streep. Major portions of the film were shot on location in Albany. The film was nominated for Academy Awards for Best Actor in a Leading Role (for Nicholson) and Best Actress in a Leading Role (for Streep).

In 1986, Audio Partners produced an audiobook version of Ironweed, read by Jason Robards. 

In 2009, Audible.com produced an audio version of Ironweed, narrated by Jonathan Davis as part of its Modern Vanguard line of audiobooks.

Structure
The structure of the novel resembles Dante's Divine Comedy.
Francis Phelan is the journeyman as Dante is the journeyman throughout The Inferno. 
The opening epigraph is from Purgatorio. 

The 7 chapters correlate to the seven deadly sins. 
In order of the chapters, they are:
 Gluttony
 Sloth
 Pride
 Greed
 Wrath
 Envy

References

External links
New York Times review
Film page at IMDB

1983 American novels  
American novels adapted into films
Great Depression novels
Novels by William Kennedy
Novels set in Albany, New York
Novels about homelessness
PEN/Faulkner Award for Fiction-winning works
Pulitzer Prize for Fiction-winning works
Viking Press books